The 2005 Nationwide Tour season ran from January 27 to October 30. The season consisted of 31 official money golf tournaments, five of which were played outside the United States. The top 21 players on the year-end money list earned their PGA Tour card for 2006.

Schedule
The following table lists official events during the 2005 season.

Money leaders
For full rankings, see 2005 Nationwide Tour graduates.

The money list was based on prize money won during the season, calculated in U.S. dollars. The top 21 players on the tour earned status to play on the 2006 PGA Tour.

Awards

See also
2005 Nationwide Tour graduates

Notes

References

External links
Schedule

Korn Ferry Tour seasons
Nationwide Tour